Larry Moss is an American actor, director and acting coach. He wrote the acting textbook, The Intent to Live, and has directed numerous theatre productions, most notably The Syringa Tree and Holding the Man.

History
He first began his acting career in New York starring in Upstairs at the Downstairs and appearing on Broadway in West Side Story, Drat! The Cat!, God's Favorite, So Long, 174th Street, The Robber Bridegroom, and I Love My Wife. He switched to teaching after he started having stage fright before shows.

He taught at Juilliard and Circle in the Square in New York. He originally came to Los Angeles to train C. Thomas Howell for The Hitcher. After Helen Hunt thanked him in her acceptance speech after winning an Oscar in 1997 for As Good as It Gets, the A-List demand for Moss' coaching increased. He coached Hilary Swank in her Academy Award-winning performances in Boys Don’t Cry and Million Dollar Baby, Michael Clarke Duncan for his Oscar-nominated performance in The Green Mile, Hank Azaria's Emmy winning turn in Tuesdays with Morrie, and Tobey Maguire in Seabiscuit. He worked with Leonardo DiCaprio on his Oscar nominated and Golden Globe winning portrayals in The Aviator and The Wolf of Wall Street, as well as on DiCaprio's Oscar nominated turn in Blood Diamond, and The Departed. 

Moss founded The Larry Moss Studio (now The Acting Studio at Edgemar Center for the Arts) with Michelle Danner. Larry Moss no longer teaches at the Edgemar Center for the Arts. He works internationally as a private acting coach.

Method
He studied his craft under Stella Adler, Sanford Meisner and Warren Robertson.

Director
Larry Moss has also directed a number of film and theatre productions including The Syringa Tree, Dos corazones both as a play and on film, Beast on the Moon, and Runt of the Litter, a 2002 play which was written and starred professional American football player Bo Eason. In 2014 Moss directed a Los Angeles production of the Australian classic Holding the Man for The Australian Theater Company. The production was met with strong critical praise citing Moss' direction and the performances of the cast. His next project will be a biographical film about Montgomery Clift entitled Monty Clift with Matt Bomer signed to play the title role.

Credits

References

Other sources
Rand, Ronald and Luigi Scorcia (2007). Acting Teachers of America: A Vital Tradition. Allworth Press, New York. .

External links
 
 

American acting coaches
American film directors
Living people
Year of birth missing (living people)